The 1998 Scottish Conservative Party leadership election was an internal party election for a new leader of the Scottish Conservative and Unionist Party. The previous year the party had lost all of its MPs in the 1997 general election. Two individuals put themselves forward; Former Scottish Conservative President David McLetchie, and former Ayr MP Phil Gallie. McLetchie won the election with 52.3% of votes cast. The Leader was elected via a secret ballot at a meeting of senior party officials, including Conservative candidates for the Scottish parliament, constituency chairs, area officers and the party’s Scottish executive.

Leadership Election

References

1998 in Scotland
1990s elections in Scotland
1998 elections in the United Kingdom
1998
Scottish Conservative Party leadership election
September 1998 events in the United Kingdom